Biological inequity , also known as biological inequality, refers to “systematic, unfair, and avoidable stress-related biological differences which increase risk of disease, observed between social groups of a population”. The term developed by Centric Lab aims to unify societal factors with the biological underpinnings of health inequities – the unfair and avoidable differences in health status and risks between social groups of a population - such that these inequalities can be investigated in a holistic manner.

Mechanism 
Biological inequity posits that health inequity in urban populations is a result of structurally racist processes executed through the built environment. Specifically, particular social groups are disproportionately exposed to physical and psychosocial stressors in the urban environment. For example, studies show Black, Asian and Minority Ethnic (BAME) groups inhabit more deprived and environmentally polluted neighbourhoods. Through this, these groups experience prolonged exposure to physical (e.g. air pollution) and psychosocial (e.g. discrimination) stressors resulting in chronic stress. Chronic stress increases the individuals ‘allostatic load’ level – which refers to the wear and tear of stress-related biological systems e.g., neuroendocrine, metabolic, immune systems. In turn, these stress-related biological differences increase the risk of disease and poorer health outcomes.

Measures and predictors of biological inequity 
Measures have been developed to quantify biological inequity by combining physical (e.g., air pollution, noise pollution, light pollution) and psychosocial factors (e.g., deprivation) that define the phenomena such as the ‘Biological Inequity Index.

As a phenomenon, biological inequity is situated at the intersection between poverty, structural racism, and place. As such, biological inequity as expressed through allostatic load is correlated with factors such as socioeconomic status, ethnic and racial grouping, and urban factors e.g. green space, housing quality.

Health outcomes 
Biological inequity increases the risk of disease and poor health outcomes for a social group through;

 disproportionate exposure to the cause(s) of the disease brought about by direct exposure to physical and/or psychosocial stressors, or 
 greater adverse effects of the cause(s) of a disease brought about from accumulated stress-related biological differences i.e. higher levels of allostatic load.

Non-communicable diseases 

Obesity has been linked to biological inequity factors such as air pollution and psychosocial stress. Similar findings have shown diabetes to be associated with physical and psychosocial stressors.

Mental health 
Mental health conditions such as depression, anxiety have been linked to biological inequity factors such as air pollution, noise pollution and area deprivation

Infectious disease 
Measures of Biological inequity such as psychosocial stress and environmental stress have been shown to correlate with Covid-19 mortality rates, suggesting possible increased exposure to Covid-19 or increased vulnerability to the virus.

References

Further reading 
 Camargo, A. et al. Using an Ecological and Biological Framing for an Anti-racist Covid-19 Approach. medRxiv 2021.01.24.21250397 (2021) doi:10.1101/2021.01.24.21250397.
 UNDP Eurasia. Questioning Identity and The Past - Encoding Inequalities in our Infrastructures M1S3. (2021).
 Centric Lab — What is Health. Centric Lab https://www.thecentriclab.com/what-is-health.
 Aliko, S., Camargo, A., Artus, J., Akinola-Odusola, D. & Hossain, E. Neuroscience, urban regeneration and urban health. J. Urban Regen. Renew. 13, 280–289 (2020).
 www.thecentriclab.com
 WHO. Health inequities and their causes. https://www.who.int/news-room/facts-in-pictures/detail/health-inequities-and-their-causes.
 Braveman, P. Health disparities and health equity: concepts and measurement. Annu. Rev. Public Health 27, 167–194 (2006).
 People living in deprived neighbourhoods. https://www.ethnicity-facts-figures.service.gov.uk/uk-population-by-ethnicity/demographics/people-living-in-deprived-neighbourhoods/latest#main-facts-and-figures.
 Brulle, R. J. & Pellow, D. N. ENVIRONMENTAL JUSTICE: Human Health and Environmental Inequalities. Annu. Rev. Public Health 27, 103–124 (2006).
 Thomson, E. M. Air Pollution, Stress, and Allostatic Load: Linking Systemic and Central Nervous System Impacts. J. Alzheimers Dis. 69, 597–614.
 Egan, M., Tannahill, C., Petticrew, M. & Thomas, S. Psychosocial risk factors in home and community settings and their associations with population health and health inequalities: A systematic meta-review. BMC Public Health 8, 1–13 (2008).
 Schulz, A. J. et al. Associations Between Socioeconomic Status and Allostatic Load: Effects of Neighborhood Poverty and Tests of Mediating Pathways. Am. J. Public Health 102, 1706–1714 (2012).
 McEwen, B. S. & Wingfield, J. C. What’s in a name? Integrating homeostasis, allostasis and stress. Horm. Behav. 57, 105 (2010).
 McEwen, B. S. Allostasis and Allostatic Load: Implications for Neuropsychopharmacology. Neuropsychopharmacology 22, 108–124 (2000).
 Centric Lab. Biological Inequities Index. Centric Lab https://www.thecentriclab.com/biological-inequities-index (2021).
 Seeman, T., Epel, E., Gruenewald, T., Karlamangla, A. & McEwen, B. S. Socio-economic differentials in peripheral biology: Cumulative allostatic load: SES peripheral biology. Ann. N. Y. Acad. Sci. 1186, 223–239 (2010).
 Geronimus, A. T., Hicken, M., Keene, D. & Bound, J. “Weathering” and Age Patterns of Allostatic Load Scores Among Blacks and Whites in the United States. Am. J. Public Health 96, 826–833 (2006).
 Egorov, A. I. et al. Vegetated land cover near residence is associated with reduced allostatic load and improved biomarkers of neuroendocrine, metabolic and immune functions. Environ. Res. 158, 508–521 (2017).
 Riva, M. et al. Household crowding is associated with higher allostatic load among the Inuit. J. Epidemiol. Community Health 68, 363–369 (2014).
 Jung, C.-C., Liang, H.-H., Lee, H.-L., Hsu, N.-Y. & Su, H.-J. Allostatic load model associated with indoor environmental quality and sick building syndrome among office workers. PLOS ONE 9, e95791 (2014).
 Gochfeld, M. & Burger, J. Disproportionate Exposures in Environmental Justice and Other Populations: The Importance of Outliers. Am. J. Public Health 101, S53–S63 (2011).
 Kim, J. S. et al. Associations of air pollution, obesity and cardiometabolic health in young adults: The Meta-AIR study. Environ. Int. 133, 105180 (2019).
 An, R., Ji, M., Yan, H. & Guan, C. Impact of ambient air pollution on obesity: a systematic review. Int. J. Obes. 42, 1112–1126 (2018).
 Cuevas, A. G., Chen, R., Thurber, K. A., Slopen, N. & Williams, D. R. Psychosocial Stress and Overweight and Obesity: Findings From the Chicago Community Adult Health Study. Ann. Behav. Med. 53, NP (2019).
 Bowe, B. et al. The 2016 global and national burden of diabetes mellitus attributable to PM2·5 air pollution. Lancet Planet. Health 2, e301–e312 (2018).
 Steptoe, A. et al. Disruption of multisystem responses to stress in type 2 diabetes: Investigating the dynamics of allostatic load. Proc. Natl. Acad. Sci. U. S. A. 111, 15693–15698 (2014).
 Hackett, R. A. & Steptoe, A. Type 2 diabetes mellitus and psychological stress — a modifiable risk factor. Nat. Rev. Endocrinol. 13, 547–560 (2017).
 Ali, N. A. & Khoja, A. Growing Evidence for the Impact of Air Pollution on Depression. Ochsner J. 19, 4 (2019).
 Power, M. C. et al. The relation between past exposure to fine particulate air pollution and prevalent anxiety: observational cohort study. BMJ 350, h1111 (2015).
 Floud, S. et al. Medication use in relation to noise from aircraft and road traffic in six European countries: results of the HYENA study. Occup. Environ. Med. 68, 518–524 (2011).
 Orban, E. et al. Residential Road Traffic Noise and High Depressive Symptoms after Five Years of Follow-up: Results from the Heinz Nixdorf Recall Study. Environ. Health Perspect. 124, 578–585 (2016).
 Walters, K. et al. Local Area Deprivation and Urban–Rural Differences in Anxiety and Depression Among People Older Than 75 Years in Britain. Am. J. Public Health 94, 1768–1774 (2004).
 Filho, A. D. P. C., Kawachi, I., Wang, Y. P., Viana, M. C. & Andrade, L. H. S. G. Does income inequality get under the skin? A multilevel analysis of depression, anxiety and mental disorders in São Paulo, Brazil. J Epidemiol Community Health 67, 966–972 (2013).

Determinants of health